The Ohio District Courts of Appeals are the intermediate appellate courts of the U.S. state of Ohio. The Ohio Constitution provides for courts of appeals that have jurisdiction to review final appealable orders. There are twelve appellate districts, each consisting of at least one county, and the number of judges in each district varies from four to twelve. Each case is heard by a three-judge panel. There are currently 69 courts of appeals judges as provided by the statute. A court of appeals judge is an elected position, with a term of six years. The Ohio Supreme Court has the discretion to review cases from the courts of appeals, but generally the appeals process in Ohio ends with the decision of the court of appeals.

Judicial districts

Judges 
First District Court of Appeals

Second District Court of Appeals

Third District Court of Appeals

Fourth District Court of Appeals

Fifth District Court of Appeals

Sixth District Court of Appeals

Seventh District Court of Appeals

Eighth District Court of Appeals

Ninth District Court of Appeals

Tenth District Court of Appeals

Eleventh District Court of Appeals

Twelfth District Court of Appeals

See also 
 List of Ohio politicians (by state office)

References

External links 
 Homepage of the Ohio District Courts of Appeals
 Ohio State Records Search

Ohio state courts
State appellate courts of the United States
Courts and tribunals with year of establishment missing